We Were Born in a Flame is the debut full-length studio album by Canadian rock musician and singer/songwriter Sam Roberts. A re-recorded version of "Where Have All the Good People Gone?" was released as the album's first single in Canada and had a music video made for it. "Hard Road" was also released as a single with a music video in Canada. The songs "Brother Down" and "Don't Walk Away Eileen" had been previously released as radio/video singles in Canada to promote Roberts' previous EP, The Inhuman Condition. "Brother Down" was also re-recorded for this album. In the United States, "Brother Down" was used to promote the album, while in the United Kingdom, "Don't Walk Away Eileen" was used.

Earlier versions of "Brother Down", "Taj Mahal", "The Canadian Dream", "On The Run", "Climb Over Me", and "Paranoia" all previously appeared on Roberts' 2000 independently released Brother Down.

The album won two Juno Awards in 2004: Album of the Year and Rock Album Of The Year. Roberts also won the Juno award for Artist of the Year.

Commercial performance
We Were Born in a Flame debuted at No. 2 on the Canadian Albums Chart. By April 2006, the album had sold 145,000 units in Canada. The album was certified Double Platinum in Canada on May 14. 2018.

Track listing
All songs written by Sam Roberts.

Personnel
Sam Roberts - Vocals and all instruments (except drums)
George Donoso - Drums on all tracks (except "Don't Walk Away Eileen")
Jordan Zadorozny - Drums on "Don't Walk Away Eileen"
Corey Zadorozny - Additional Percussion
Eric Fares - Additional keyboard
James Hall - Additional guitar
Dave Nugent - Backing vocals

Notes

2003 debut albums
Sam Roberts albums
Juno Award for Rock Album of the Year albums
Juno Award for Album of the Year albums